International Quran News Agency (IQNA) is the first specialized Quranic news agency in the Islamic world.

See also
List of Iranian news agencies

References

External links
 Official website

News agencies based in Iran
2003 establishments in Iran
Quran
Multilingual news services